is a Japanese football player. She plays for Nojima Stella Kanagawa Sagamihara. She played for Japan national team.

Club career
Usui was born in Tokyo on December 28, 1989. After graduating from Waseda University, she retired from playing career. However, after 1 year blank, she restarted playing career at Sfida Setagaya FC in 2013. She moved to Urawa Reds in 2014. In 2017, she moved to Nojima Stella Kanagawa Sagamihara.

National team career
On September 13, 2014, Usui debuted for Japan national team against Ghana. She played for Japan at 2014 Asian Games and Japan won 2nd place. She played 6 games for Japan in 2014.

National team statistics

References

External links
Nojima Stella Kanagawa Sagamihara

1989 births
Living people
Waseda University alumni
Association football people from Tokyo
Japanese women's footballers
Japan women's international footballers
Nadeshiko League players
Sfida Setagaya FC players
Urawa Red Diamonds Ladies players
Nojima Stella Kanagawa Sagamihara players
Asian Games silver medalists for Japan
Asian Games medalists in football
Women's association football defenders
Footballers at the 2014 Asian Games
Medalists at the 2014 Asian Games
Universiade silver medalists for Japan
Universiade medalists in football
Medalists at the 2009 Summer Universiade
Medalists at the 2011 Summer Universiade